Leonora Speyer, Lady Speyer (née von Stosch; 7 November 1872 – 10 February 1956), was an American poet and violinist.

Life 

She was born in Washington, D.C., the daughter of Count Ferdinand von Stosch of Manze in Silesia, who fought for the Union, and Julia Schayer, who was a writer.

She studied music in Brussels, Paris, and Leipzig, and played the violin professionally under the batons of Arthur Nikisch and Anton Seidl, among others. She first married Louis Meredith Howland in 1894, but they divorced in Paris in 1902. She then married banker Edgar Speyer (later Sir Edgar), of London, where the couple lived until 1915.

Sir Edgar had German ancestry and following anti-German attacks on him that year, they moved to the United States and took up residence in New York, where Speyer began writing poetry. She won the 1927 Pulitzer Prize for Poetry for her book of poetry Fiddler's Farewell.

She had four daughters: Enid Howland with her first husband and Pamela, Leonora, and Vivien Claire Speyer with her second husband.

Awards 
 Golden Rose Award
 Pulitzer Prize

Selected works 
"April on the Battlefields", The Second Book of Modern Verse (1919). about.com
"A Note from the Pipes", The Second Book of Modern Verse (1919). about.com
"Suddenly", Anthology of Magazine Verse for 1920, Bartleby.com
"Song", Anthology of Magazine Verse for 1920, Bartleby.com
Oberammergau, etched, printed and bound by Bernhardt Wall, 1922, 50 copies plus 3 Etcher's Copies

American Poets, An Anthology Of Contemporary Verse (1923)
Fiddler's Farewell (1926)
Slow Wall; poems, new and selected (1939)
Slow wall; poems, together with Nor without music (1944)

Translation

Notes

External links 

 
 

1872 births
1956 deaths
Musicians from Washington, D.C.
American women poets
Pulitzer Prize for Poetry winners
American classical violinists
Women classical violinists
Poets from Washington, D.C.
American people of Silesian descent
20th-century American poets
20th-century classical violinists
20th-century American women writers
20th-century women musicians
20th-century American violinists